Herpele is a genus of caecilians in the family Herpelidae. They are endemic to Central and Western Africa (from southeastern Nigeria east to western Central African Republic and south to western Democratic Republic of the Congo, possibly to Angola).

At least Herpele squalostoma is probably oviparous and provides parental care: the young feed on their mother's skin (they are "dermatophagous").

Species
There are two recognized species:

References

 
Amphibians of Sub-Saharan Africa
Amphibian genera
Taxa named by Wilhelm Peters
Taxonomy articles created by Polbot